These are the Billboard magazine R&B singles chart number one hits of 1998

Chart history

Chart comparisons
Five songs reached number-one on the Billboard Hot 100/pop chart: "Nice and Slow," "All My Life," "Too Close," "The Boy Is Mine" and "The First Night."
Five songs reached number-one on the Rhythmic chart: "Nice and Slow," "All My Life," "Too Close," "The Boy Is Mine" and "How Deep Is Your Love."  "You Make Me Wanna..." topped the chart from last year.

See also
1998 in music
List of number-one R&B hits (United States)
List of number-one R&B albums of 1998 (U.S.)

References

1998
1998 record charts
1998 in American music